The 2013 Australian Open was a tennis tournament that took place in Melbourne Park in Melbourne, Australia, from 14 to 27 January 2013. It was the 101st edition of the Australian Open, and the first Grand Slam event of the year. The tournament consisted of events for professional players in singles, doubles and mixed doubles play. Junior and wheelchair players competed in singles and doubles tournaments.

All four of the main events in singles and same-sex doubles were won by the top seeds—Novak Djokovic in men's singles, Victoria Azarenka in women's singles, Bob and Mike Bryan in men's doubles, and Sara Errani and Roberta Vinci in women's doubles. This year's Australian Open was the first Grand Slam event since that tournament's 2004 edition in which the women's singles and doubles were won by the top seeds, and the first Grand Slam event since the 1997 Wimbledon Championships in which the men's and women's singles and doubles were all won by the top seeds. In addition, this year's Australian Open remains the most recent Grand Slam where the men's and women's singles titles were both successfully defended.

Point and prize money distribution

Point distribution
Below is a series of tables for each of the competitions showing the ranking points on offer for each event.

Seniors points

Junior points

Wheelchair points

Prize money
The 2013 Australian Open featured a significant increase in prize money in comparison with previous years, with all players competing for a share of AUD$30 million, becoming the highest paying tournament of all time. This was the result of an ATP players' meeting, primarily focusing on the money received by players who exit the competition in the earlier rounds. All prize money is in Australian dollars (AUD).

* per team

Singles players
Men's singles

Women's singles

Day-by-day summaries

Champions

Seniors

Men's singles

 Novak Djokovic defeated   Andy Murray, 6–7(2–7), 7–6(7–3), 6–3, 6–2
• It was Djokovic's 6th career Grand Slam singles title and his 4th title at the Australian Open (a record).

Women's singles

 Victoria Azarenka defeated  Li Na, 4–6, 6–4, 6–3
• It was Azarenka's 2nd career Grand Slam singles title and her 2nd (consecutive) title at the Australian Open.

Men's doubles

 Bob Bryan /  Mike Bryan defeated  Robin Haase /  Igor Sijsling, 6–3, 6–4
• It was Bob and Mike's 13th career Grand Slam doubles title and their 6th title at the Australian Open. The victory also gave them sole possession of the all-time record for Grand Slam men's doubles titles by a team.

Women's doubles

 Sara Errani /  Roberta Vinci defeated  Ashleigh Barty /  Casey Dellacqua, 6–2, 3–6, 6–2
• It was Errani's 3rd career Grand Slam doubles title and her 1st title at the Australian Open.
• It was Vinci's 3rd career Grand Slam doubles title and her 1st title at the Australian Open.

Mixed doubles

 Jarmila Gajdošová /  Matthew Ebden defeated  Lucie Hradecká /  František Čermák, 6–3, 7–5
• It was Gajdošová's 1st career Grand Slam mixed doubles title.
• It was Ebden's 1st career Grand Slam mixed doubles title.

Juniors

Boys' singles

 Nick Kyrgios defeated  Thanasi Kokkinakis 7–6(7–4), 6–3

Girls' singles

 Ana Konjuh defeated  Kateřina Siniaková 6–3, 6–4

Boys' doubles

 Jay Andrijic /  Bradley Mousley defeated  Maximilian Marterer /  Lucas Miedler 6–3, 7–6(7–3)

Girls' doubles

 Ana Konjuh /  Carol Zhao defeated  Oleksandra Korashvili /  Barbora Krejčíková 5–7, 6–4, [10–7]

Wheelchair tennis

Wheelchair men's singles

 Shingo Kunieda defeated  Stéphane Houdet 6–2, 6–0

Wheelchair women's singles

 Aniek van Koot defeated  Sabine Ellerbrock 6–1, 1–6, 7–5

Wheelchair quad singles

 David Wagner defeated  Andrew Lapthorne 2–6, 6–1, 6–4

Wheelchair men's doubles

 Michaël Jérémiasz /  Shingo Kunieda defeated  Stefan Olsson /  Adam Kellerman 6–0, 6–1

Wheelchair women's doubles

 Jiske Griffioen /  Aniek van Koot defeated  Lucy Shuker /  Marjolein Buis 6–4, 6–3

Wheelchair quad doubles

 David Wagner /  Nicholas Taylor defeated  Andrew Lapthorne /  Anders Hard 6–2, 6–3

Players

Seniors

Singles seeds
Seeds and Rankings are as of 7 January 2013 and Points are as of 14 January 2013.
Men's singles

Withdrawn players (men's singles)

Women's singles

Main draw wildcard entries

Men's singles
  James Duckworth
  John Millman
  Ben Mitchell
  Josselin Ouanna
  Luke Saville
  John-Patrick Smith
  Rhyne Williams
  Wu Di

Women's singles
  Ashleigh Barty
  Bojana Bobusic
  Jarmila Gajdošová
  Caroline Garcia
  Sacha Jones
  Madison Keys
  Olivia Rogowska
  Zhang Yuxuan

Men's doubles
  Matthew Barton /  John Millman
  Alex Bolt /  Greg Jones
  James Duckworth /  Chris Guccione
  Samuel Groth /  Matt Reid
  Minos Kokkinakis /  Andrew Harris
  John Peers /  John-Patrick Smith
  Danai Udomchoke /  Jimmy Wang

Women's doubles
  Monique Adamczak /  Stephanie Bengson
  Ashleigh Barty /  Casey Dellacqua
  Cara Black /  Anastasia Rodionova
  Bojana Bobusic /  Jessica Moore
  Han Xinyun /  Zhou Yimiao
  Viktorija Rajicic /  Storm Sanders
  Arina Rodionova /  Olivia Rogowska

Mixed doubles
  Ashleigh Barty /  Jack Sock
  Cara Black /  Paul Hanley
  Bojana Bobusic /  Chris Guccione
  Casey Dellacqua /  John-Patrick Smith
  Jarmila Gajdošová /  Matthew Ebden
  Olivia Rogowska /  Marinko Matosevic
  Samantha Stosur /  Luke Saville

Main draw qualifiers entries

Men's singles

  Maxime Authom
  Jamie Baker
  Ruben Bemelmans
  Ričardas Berankis
  Alex Bogomolov Jr.
  Daniel Brands
  Arnau Brugués Davi
  Steve Johnson
  Adrian Mannarino
  Adrián Menéndez
  Daniel Muñoz de la Nava
  Rajeev Ram
  Julian Reister
  Dudi Sela
  Cedrik-Marcel Stebe
  Amir Weintraub
The following players received entry from a lucky loser spot:
  Tim Smyczek

Women's singles

  Akgul Amanmuradova
  Gréta Arn
  Vesna Dolonc
  Vera Dushevina
  Daria Gavrilova
  Maria João Koehler
  Karin Knapp
  Luksika Kumkhum
  Michelle Larcher de Brito
  Valeria Savinykh
  Lesia Tsurenko
  Chan Yung-jan

Protected ranking
The following players were accepted directly into the main draw using a protected ranking:

 Men's Singles
  Somdev Devvarman (PR 85)
  Tommy Robredo (PR 50)

 Women's Singles
  Rebecca Marino (PR 114)

Withdrawals
The following players were accepted directly into the main tournament, but withdrew with injuries or personal reasons.

Men's Singles
  Mardy Fish → replaced by  Jan Hájek
  John Isner → replaced by  Tim Smyczek
  Rafael Nadal → replaced by  Matthew Ebden
  David Nalbandian → replaced by  Mikhail Kukushkin
  Andy Roddick → replaced by  Sergiy Stakhovsky
  Jürgen Zopp → replaced by  Jesse Levine

Women's Singles
  Iveta Benešová → replaced by  Sesil Karatantcheva
  Petra Cetkovská → replaced by  Karolína Plíšková
  Kaia Kanepi → replaced by  Donna Vekić
  Flavia Pennetta → replaced by  Jana Čepelová
  Aleksandra Wozniak → replaced by  Rebecca Marino
  Barbora Záhlavová-Strýcová → replaced by  Garbiñe Muguruza
  Vera Zvonareva → replaced by  Elina Svitolina

References

External links